Lovett is an English surname. Notable people with the surname include:

People

Academics
Clara Lovett, Italian-born American former president of Northern Arizona University
Edgar Odell Lovett (1871–1957), American mathematics professor and first president of Rice Institute (now Rice University)

Actors and musicians
Ben Lovett (born 1978), American musician and film composer
Ben Lovett (British musician) (born 1986), British musician and member of Mumford & Sons
Lyle Lovett (born 1957), American singer-songwriter and actor
Martin Lovett (1927–2020), English cellist
Norman Lovett (born 1946), English stand-up comedian and actor
Ruby Lovett (born 1967), American country music singer

Political figures
Lewis Johnstone Lovett (1867–1942), member of the Canadian House of Commons
Phineas Lovett (1745–1828), farmer, merchant, judge and political figure in Nova Scotia, Canada

Sportspeople
Andrew Lovett (born 1982), Australian rules footballer
Claire Lovett (1910–2005), Canadian badminton and tennis player
Frances Lovett (fl. 1946), All-American Girls Professional Baseball League player
James Lovett (born 1986), American professional surfer, skimboarder and wakeboarder
Jay Lovett (born 1978), English footballer
Mem Lovett (1912–1995), American baseball player
Nathan Lovett-Murray (born 1982), Australian rules footballer
Tom Lovett (1863–1928), American baseball pitcher

Other
Ann Lovett (1968–1984), Irish schoolgirl who died while giving birth
Bill Lovett (1894–1923), Irish-American gangster
John Lovett (disambiguation), multiple people
Linda Lovett, Indigenous Australian barrister
Neville Lovett (1869–1951), English bishop
Richard Lovett (disambiguation), multiple people
Robert Lovett (disambiguation), multiple people
William Lovett (1800–1877), British activist

Fictional characters
Mrs. Lovett, character in Sweeney Todd
Ethan Lovett, character on the soap opera General Hospital
Brock Lovett, treasure hunter in the 1997 film Titanic

English-language surnames
Surnames of Norman origin